SCMA may refer to:

 ICAO code of the Puerto Marín Balmaceda Airport
 Saskatchewan Country Music Awards
 Scottish Childminding Association
 Scuola Militare di Alpinismo, Italian winter warfare school; today: Centro Addestramento Alpino
 Southern California Military Academy
 Southern Community Media Association
 Southwest Celtic Music Association
 Sport Clube Mineiro Aljustrelense
 Stilton Cheesemakers' Association, see Stilton Cheese
 SubCarrier Multiple Access
 SCM Agreement
 Supply Chain Management Association
 The Society for the Current Middle Ages
 Smith College Museum of Art